Jamaica competed at the 2020 Summer Paralympics in Tokyo, Japan, originally scheduled to take place in 2020 but postponed to 23 July to 8 August 2021 because of the COVID-19 pandemic.

Competitors

Athletics

Judo

Taekwondo

Jamaica qualified one athletes to compete at the Paralympics competition. Shauna-Kay Hines qualified by received the bipartite commission invitation allocation quotas.

See also
 Jamaica at the Paralympics
 Jamaica at the 2020 Summer Olympics

References

Nations at the 2020 Summer Paralympics
2020
2020 in Jamaican sport